Resurrection of the Lord Catholic Church in Waipahu is a parish of the Roman Catholic Church of Hawaii in the United States.  Located in Waipahu on the island of Oahu, the church falls under the jurisdiction of the Diocese of Honolulu and its bishop.

Roman Catholic Diocese of Honolulu
Roman Catholic churches in Hawaii
Religious buildings and structures in Honolulu County, Hawaii